Louis Paul André Chack, (12 February 1876 — 9 January 1945), was a French Navy officer, author and Nazi collaborator. He served in the Navy during the First World War, and spent the interwar period writing books on naval history, and agitating at the Far-Right. During the Second World War, he eagerly collaborated with the Nazi, presiding a so-called "Comité d'action antibolchévique" ("committee for anti-Bolshevik action"). At the Liberation, he was arrested, tried to treason, and executed by firing squad.

Biography 

Chack was born to Marie-Louise Chack, also known as "Marie Scalini" (1852–1931), and of Lord Fingall, who refused to marry her but still purchased a house for her and paid her a pension.

Chack joined the École navale in October 1893, the 50th of the 75 students of the class of that year. He graduated in 1896.

He served on the battleship Hoche, then on Masséna in the North sea, and was promoted to Ensign first class in October 1898. He then served on Mouette at Constantinople, where he earned a Turkish medal by fighting a fire.

Chack was promoted to lieutenant de vaisseau in May 1906, and given command of the submarine Grondin. In 1908, he was appointed as aid to the general governor of Indochina.

He served on Jauréguiberry in 1912 as gunnery officer, and was promoted to the fire direction of the battleship Courbet in 1914. In June 1915, he was given command of the destroyer Massue, taking part in the Gallipoli campaign. On 27 November 1916, he attacked a German submarine, earning an Army-level mention in dispatches.

Check was promoted to lieutenant-commander in July 1917, and to commander in June 1920. He captained the battleship Provence in the Mediterranean before transferring to the Service historique de la marine as Direction 1921. In 1927, he was received as a member of the Académie de marine. He was promoted to captain in July 1929, and retired from the Navy in November 1934 with the rank of captain.

From the 1920. Chack started writing numerous works about the Navy and naval history.

Chack started mixing with Far-Right elements infiltrating the veteran associations of the time. He was vice-président of the l'Association nationale des officiers combattants (ANOC), under Right-Wing personalities such as Colonel Jean Ferrandi and Charles Trochu. Chack was also president of the Club de l'Effort, an organisation founded by reserve officers, many of whom were members of the far-right Ligues.

In 1937, he was among the Right-wing and Far-Right personalities in honouring Charles Maurras when he was freed from prison. He joined Jacques Doriot's Parti populaire français (PPF) in 1937.

During the Nazi Occupation, Chack supported Collaboration with the Third Reich. He also displayed a virulent antisemitism. He notably inaugurated the Institut d'étude des questions juives in May 1941, and wrote antisemitic editorials in journals.

Chack was president of the Comité d’action antibolchévique (1941–1944), an anticommunist and antisemitic propaganda outlet used as a recruitment organ for the Légion des volontaires français contre le bolchévisme. Chack inaugurated the exhibit Le Bolchevisme contre l'Europe, along with French and German fascists such as Paul Marion, Fernand de Brinon or Georges Claude.

On 22 August 1944, after the Libération, Chack was arrested and imprisoned at Drancy, and then at Fresnes. He was trialed by the Cour de justice of Seine, sentenced to death on 18 December 1944 and shot on 9 January 1945 at fort de Montrouge, near Paris.

Honours 
 Croix de guerre
 Legion of Honour: Knight in 1909, Officer in 1921, Commandeur on 21 November 1934. Expelled for treason in 1945.

Works 
 Au large d'Ouessant (Éditions de France, collection "la mer et notre Empire")
 Du Maroc à l'Océan Indien (Éditions de France, collection "la mer et notre Empire")
 Les Explorateurs  (Éditions de France, collection "la mer et notre Empire")
 Face aux Anglais (Éditions de France, collection "la mer et notre Empire")
 La Fin d'un Pirate (Éditions de France, collection "la mer et notre Empire")
 Courbet, le vainqueur de Fou-Tchéou , Édition Amiot-Dumont
 Les Grandes Croisières françaises (ouvrage pour la reliure duquel Jean Goulden réalisa des émaux.)
 On se bat sur mer, Éditions de France, 1926 (prix de La Renaissance)
 Des Dardanelles aux brumes du Nord (Éditions de France, collection "Marins à la bataille")
 Patrouilles tragiques dans la nuit (Éditions de France, collection "Marins à la bataille")
 Combats de mer au grand soleil (Éditions de France, collection "Marins à la bataille")
 La route des Indes sauvée par la France (Éditions de France, collection "Marins à la bataille")
 Héros de l'Adriatique (Éditions de France, collection "Marins à la bataille")
 Survivants prodigieux (Éditions de France, collection "Marins à la bataille")
 Sur mer... Et dessous (Éditions de France, collection "Marins à la bataille")
 Luttes sans merci au sud et au nord (Éditions de France, collection "Marins à la bataille")
 Avions, torpilleurs et voiliers au feu (Éditions de France, collection "Marins à la bataille"), 1933, avec des illustrations de Léon Haffner.
 Petits navires, grandes luttes (Éditions de France, collection "Marins à la bataille")
 La bataille de Lépante(Les Éditions de France, collection" Marins à la Bataille").
 Trafalgar (Les Éditions de France, collection " Marins à la Bataille").
 Hasards de guerre (Les Éditions de France, collection " Marins à la Bataille ").
 Les Frégates du Roi (Les Éditions de France, collection "Marins à la Bataille").
 La guerre des croiseurs, du 4 août 1914 à la bataille des Falkland (Deux volumes et deux atlas.)
 Sur les bancs de Flandre (avec 2 cartes dessinées par P. Chack), Les Éditions de France, 1927
 Ceux du blocus (avec 11 cartes dessinées par P. Chack), Les Éditions de France, 1928
 Tu seras marin (Les Éditions de France, 1939. collection "Marins à la Bataille", dessins de Léon Haffner).
 Histoire maritime de la Première guerre mondiale par Paul Chack et Jean-Jacques Antier (France-Empire, 3 volumes, réédition abrégée en 1 volume, 1992)
 Hoang-Tham, pirate, Éditions de France, 1933

Sources and references 
 Notes

References

Bibliography
 , [présentation en ligne].
 
 .

External links

 

1876 births
1945 deaths
Nazi collaborators shot at the Fort de Montrouge
Executed writers
Antisemitism in France
French Popular Party politicians
20th-century French writers